, or  as it is properly known in Japan with the honorific prefix , is a Japanese traditional custom which relates closely to Western matchmaking, in which a woman and a man are introduced to each other to consider the possibility of marriage. The term  is sometimes mistranslated as an "arranged marriage" but it can be described as a meeting opportunity with more serious considerations for the future as a  process of courtship. According to the National Institute of Population and Social Security Research, in 2005 it was estimated that around 6.2% of marriages in Japan are arranged via .

History

The practice of  emerged in 16th century Japan among the samurai classes, with the intention to form and protect strong military alliances among warlords to ensure mutual support. Later, during the Tokugawa period (1603–1868), the practice of  spread to other urban classes trying to emulate samurai customs. It became the practice for those seeking a union between families, and parents on both sides made all the decisions regarding marriage.

 was a solemn practice and involved considerations that are not given as much weight by most modern Japanese people, such as family bloodlines and class.

After the Pacific War, the trend was to abandon the restrictive arranged-meetings system. In the 1930s and 40s,  practices accounted for 69% of marriages in Japan; by 2010 the figure had dropped to 5.2%. There have also been accounts of how parents pressure their unmarried children into arranged meetings that eventually lead to marriages, particularly with children who would assume family responsibilities such as those inheriting a family business.

Historically,  signified that the parties were brought together expressly for the purpose of marriage on the initiative of the parents, a friend of the family, or a go-between. It also meant that the initial criteria of selection were objective ones. The potential spouse and their family met with the go-between and examined all eligible persons. The  frequently included the name, age, health, education, occupation and marital status of all members of the candidate's family.

The participant and their family examined the photos and short personal histories based on an investigation of social consideration. The education level and occupations of the potential candidate's family were historically the first aspects taken into consideration at that meeting.

In more selective , the candidates and their families were judged on a larger set of criteria aimed at determining the suitability and the balance of the marriage. They included level of education, income, occupation, physical attractiveness, religion, social standing, and hobbies. The participant's  also played a large role. Many were fearful of the possibility that a potential candidate's blood was contaminated with diseases such as epilepsy, neurosis, or mental illness. The fear was so prevalent that the Eugenic Protection Law of 1948 was passed to legalize sterilization and abortion for people with a history of mental defects and other hereditary diseases. Social status also played a large role in selecting a candidate. Ideally, paired candidates and their families would be of equal social status, so some candidates had a hard time finding a mate if their family was not of a certain social status. Family lineage also affected the quality of candidates historically; for example, a candidate with samurai blood was more likely to be picked than one with ancestry from a different class, especially during the Tokugawa era.

Historically,  marriage was criticized for promoting patriarchal relationships with traditional power structures and distinct divisions of labor between males and females.

Investigation
The  provided, and still provides, a substantial amount of information regarding each candidate. The family researched the family lineage of each candidate provided by the  once the preliminary list had been constructed. In rural areas, a common investigative method was to personally ask about the family of interest by questioning shopkeepers and neighbors through  ("inquiry of mouth").

Introduction
Before the  occurred, the parties scrutinized each other's pictures to prevent future rejection, something which still occurs through online -based services in Japan today. Historically the  determined the place and format of the meeting.

The introduction was often followed by small talk between the parents. Occasionally, the conversation shifted to one of the potential candidates. Toward the end of the meeting, the potential couple were often advised to go off to spend some time alone, in order to get better acquainted.

(excuse, apology, refusal)
If the initial  introduction was successful, the potential couple went through a series of dates until a decision was reached. The decision was usually expressed at the couple's third meeting. Contrastingly, there were also standard provisions to turn down an offer or proposal with relatively little loss of face for the party being refused.

Historical discrimination
Historically, there was some amount of racial, class, and genetic discrimination in the  process.

Many Japan-born Koreans were discriminated against for being "half-bloods" — i.e. not of full Japanese ancestry. Also, the year of the Horse in the fifth cycle of the Japanese lunar calendar,  — every 60th year — were thought to be bad luck. Women born during those years would often claim to have been born in the previous or following year. The belief was so widespread that in 1966, according to the Japan Statistical Yearbook, the birthrate in Japan took a 26% dip.

This former outcast group was composed of descendants of workers traditionally associated with trades involving blood, death, or other undesirables; some examples being leather-workers, shoe-menders, and butchers, since shoes were too dirty to be taken into the house, and meat was in the past forbidden by the Buddhist faith. During the Tokugawa shogunate, demotion to  status was sometimes a way of punishing criminals. Today,  members may be identified by the region of the city where they live or by their street address, though it is getting increasingly rare and Japanese people's views on shoes and beef among other things have changed significantly.

Members of the Ainu people, an indigenous people from the Hokkaidō region, were commonly avoided as well. Descendants of people who were exposed to the radiation from the atomic bombs dropped on Hiroshima and Nagasaki were also avoided due to perceptions regarding possible child deformities and susceptibilities to rare diseases.

Modern-day  practices

Participants
Today, most  processes only involve the potential partners to be married; rarely these days are the families of these candidates involved.

A  still serves in the role of go-between for potential marriage partners in the  process.

The  is expected to play a variety of roles throughout the  process. The first is the bridging role, in which the  introduces potential candidates, and potentially their families to each other depending on requirements. The second role, which is increasingly less common in modern Japan, is as a liaison for the families to avoid direct confrontation and differences in opinions between them by serving as an intermediary for working out the details of the marriage. The  is even consulted by the married couple after their wedding if they encounter problems in their married life.

Even though  marriages are less common than they once were, they do still hold a place in popular media.

Selection process
Historically, the initiative for the  introductions often came from the parents who felt that their son or daughter was of a marriageable age, usually in the range of 22 to 30, but had shown little or no interest in seeking a partner on their own. Most commonly now, the decision to contact a marriage agency comes directly from the person who seeks a partner, and it is usually due to their lack of opportunity to meet a suitable spouse. At other times, the individual may ask friends or acquaintances to introduce potential spouses in a similar way.

Sometimes, parents subtly interject the phrase  into casual conversation, to imply that both parents have consented for their daughter to meet eligible men. In exceptional circumstances, though growing increasingly rare now, some parents send a candidacy picture to a future husband or go-between without their daughter's knowledge or consent. In general now, though, marriage agencies performing  duties only discuss introductions and registration with their clients directly, thus removing involvement of parents entirely in many cases.

In Japan, many women are stereotyped as looking for three attributes: height (specifically someone tall), high salary, and high education. This is commonly known as the "Three H's."

Attitudes
Modern attitudes toward  have changed significantly. According to an estimate in 1998, between ten and thirty percent of all marriages that took place in Japan at that time were  marriages. The National Institute of Population and Social Security Research in 2005 estimated that 6.2% of marriages in Japan were arranged, with younger generations estimated in 1995 to be more likely to pursue marriages preceded by romantic courtship instead. Though the Japanese term for romantic love implies that there are no constraints against selecting individuals whom one can marry, it is not always possible to classify a particular marriage as "love" or "arranged", as parental influence on potential spouses is present in both  and "love" marriages in Japan.

In 1995, women were reported as more inclined to seek a romantic relationship than men, with the inculturation of Western ideals of true love, followed by marital and domestic bliss, at times seen as the cause for the discrepancy. Women in Japan were historically raised with the expectation that they may only find satisfaction within the home as wives and mothers, with later generations more likely to place greater emphasis on the less traditional ideals of romantic love. Despite this, the number of Japanese women pursuing careers and other avenues of fulfillment has increased, resulting in a falling rate of marriages within Japan.

This method has become more popular among university students and younger company workers since it is highly informal and does not involve parents.

Gender and 
In recent decades, some companies have started offering various services to their employees as ways of helping them find potential partners. These services include marriage counseling and personal introductions, where the employees can join a club that provides guidance and services to match them up with suitable partners.

The idea of the cutoff age is taken quite seriously, with the tendency for women who remain unmarried past  to be treated as inferior. They are often compared to Japanese Christmas cake: fresh up until the 25th of December but becoming less appetizing with every day past this date.

Men possess a greater degree of choice and freedom. Previously, a man who was not married by his 30s was considered untrustworthy by colleagues and employers, who believed that such men have not been conditioned to learn the fundamental principles of co-operation and responsibility. For males, marriage also makes an implicit statement about staying in the family business. While previously men who engaged in  often occupied dominant roles within the marriage, many of the men now registered with marriage agencies for help in finding a wife through  are seeking a balanced, loving relationship with mutual love between partners.

In other countries
In China, 82% of first-tier-city dwellers had experienced , primarily due to parental pressure and a lack of opportunity to meet people of the opposite sex.

In literature
 is one of the main topics of Jun'ichirō Tanizaki's The Makioka Sisters, which was published in the 1940s.

See also

 Arranged marriage
 Shotgun wedding
 Matrimonial websites
 Matchmaker
 Culture of Japan

References

Arranged marriage
Marriage, unions and partnerships in Japan
Japanese words and phrases